"Aliisedimentitalea" is a Gram-negative and aerobic genus of bacteria from the family of Rhodobacteraceae with one known species ("Aliisedimentitalea scapharcae"). "Aliisedimentitalea scapharcae" has been isolated from the shell of Scapharca broughtonii from the South Sea in Korea.

References

Rhodobacteraceae
Bacteria genera
Monotypic bacteria genera